The 2008 Fujitsu V8 Supercars season was the ninth running of the Fujitsu V8 Supercars Series, the second-tier V8 Supercar series. It began on 21 February at the Clipsal 500 and ended on 7 December at Oran Park Raceway in New South Wales after seven rounds.

Race calendar
The series consisted of six events in support to the 2008 V8 Supercar Championship Series and one stand-alone event.

Teams and drivers
The following teams and drivers have competed during the 2008 Fujitsu V8 Supercar Series. This was the last season the Ford AU Falcon was eligible.

Points system
Points are awarded to any driver that completes 75% of race distance and is running on the completion of the final lap. These are the points awarded for each race.

Driver standings

References

Fujitsu V8 Supercar Series
Supercars Development Series